The Roundheads is a BBC Books original novel written by Mark Gatiss and based on the long-running British science fiction television series Doctor Who. It features the Second Doctor, Ben, Jamie, and Polly.

Synopsis 
Landing in December 1648 after the end of Second English Civil War, the TARDIS crew gets involved with intrigue involving both the victorious Oliver Cromwell and the doomed Charles I.

References

External links

Fiction set in 1648
1997 British novels
1997 science fiction novels
Past Doctor Adventures
Second Doctor novels
Novels by Mark Gatiss
Novels set during the English Civil War